Goleniów  is a town in Pomerania, northwestern Poland with 22,844 inhabitants (2011). It is the capital of Goleniów County in West Pomeranian Voivodeship (since 1999); previously it was in Szczecin Voivodeship (1975–1998).

The international airport Szczecin-Goleniów "Solidarność" Airport is located just east of the town.

History 
The settlement dates back to the 10th century. Together with Pomerania it formed part of medieval Poland until 1138 and as a result of the 12th-century fragmentation of Poland it became part of the separate Duchy of Pomerania, ruled by the House of Griffin. Barnim I, Duke of Pomerania granted the settlement Magdeburg town rights and additional privileges in 1264, yet Gollnow was rechartered with Lübeck Law, which favoured the local merchants, in 1314. The town grew by exploiting the vast timber reserves in the town-owned forests, and by trade. The town was connected to the Baltic Sea trade routes by the port of Ihnamünde at the mouth of the Ina river. Competition with nearby Stettin (Szczecin) led to a series of conflicts between the two towns, the differences were set aside only in 1615 when the towns signed a reconciling treaty. The town remained part of the Duchy of Pomerania until Sweden took over in 1630.

The Thirty Years' War devastated the town, and as a consequence of the post-war Peace of Westphalia (1648) and Treaty of Stettin (1653), the town remained with Sweden who had occupied the area since the Treaty of Stettin (1630). The border with Brandenburg-Prussian Pomerania now ran close to the town, and cut Gollnow off from its economic hinterland, which hindered recovery from the war. Between 1677 and 1683, Gollnow was occupied by Brandenburg-Prussia. In the years that followed, the number of craftsmen in the town grew steadily. In 1720, Sweden lost its possessions south of the Peene and east of the Peenestrom rivers, including Gollnow, to Prussia in the Treaty of Stockholm. In the 19th century, craft and trade were joined by industry – Gollnow hosted a coppersmith, a needle fabrication, several facilities for the manufacturing of furniture, three breweries, a distillery, and five water mills. In the late 19th and early 20th century, the town became an important railroad junction, when it was connected to Neudamm (Dębno) and Naugard (Nowogard) in 1882, to Cammin (Kamień Pomorski) and Wollin (Wolin) in 1892, and to Massow in 1903. Gollnow was part of the Prussian province of Pomerania from 1815 to 1945. With the unification of Germany in 1871, it became part of the German Reich. In 1919, the Germans operated a camp in the town, in which they imprisoned Poles arrested in Szubin during the Greater Poland uprising. During World War II, the Nazis operated a prison in the town, with multiple forced labour subcamps located in the region. Polish forced labourers were imprisoned in the town.

On 7 March 1945, the town was captured by the Red Army. After Nazi Germany's defeat in World War II, the area became part of Poland. The town's German population was expropriated and expelled. In 1954, town limits were expanded by including Helenów as Goleniów's new district.

Population

Sports
The  running competition is held annually in the town to commemorate Poland's National Independence Day. It is one of the oldest competitions of its kind in Poland.

It competes in the lower leagues.

International relations

Goleniów is twinned with:

Former twin towns
 Guryevsk, Russia

On 25 February 2022, Goleniów ended its partnership with the Russian city of Guryevsk as a reaction to the Russian invasion of Ukraine.

Cities and towns near Goleniów
 Szczecin (Poland)
 Police, Poland
 Stargard (Poland)
 Maszewo (Poland)
 Nowogard (Poland)
 Kamień Pomorski (Poland)
 Wolin (town) (Poland)
 Golczewo (Poland)

Tourist villages near Goleniów 

 Jarszewko

Notable people

 Johan Frederik Clemens (1749–1831), a Pomeranian-Danish printmaker in etching. 
 Werner Kollath (1892–1970), a German bacteriologist, hygienist and food scientist.
 Günther Marks (1897–1978), a German church musician, organist and composer
 Helga Paris (born 1938), German photographer 
 Marek Leśniak (born 1964), a retired Polish footballer, played over 500 pro games and 20 for Poland
 Grzegorz Stępniak (born 1989) a Polish professional racing cyclist
 Tom Swoon (born 1993), DJ, remixer and record producer

References

External links

Official town website
 Jewish Community in Goleniów on Virtual Shtetl
Satellilte photo via Google Maps

Cities and towns in West Pomeranian Voivodeship
Goleniów County